The Gibraltar Legislative Council was the legislature of Gibraltar created in 1950 and sat until the creation of the Gibraltar House of Assembly in 1969.

History
Prior to 1950, the Governor-in-Council retained the legislative power in the then Crown colony. The creation of the legislature gave some limited autonomy, with seven members of the Legislative Council being elected from the 1950s on.

The legislature sat at the Legislative Council Building at John Mackintosh Square.

Elections

Elections were held every three years.

In an election held on 19 September 1956, ten candidates contested the seven elected seats. There was a turnout of 58.2 per cent, and the winners were Joshua Hassan, Abraham Serfaty, J. E. Alcantara, and Albert Risso, all of the Association for the Advancement of Civil Rights, two Independents, Solomon Seruya and Peter Isola, and one Commonwealth Party candidate, Joseph Triay.

Demise
The Legislative Council was responsible for overall affairs with local issues being dealt with by the Gibraltar City Council. With pressure from the United Nations, the British government merged the Legislative Council and City Council to a House of Assembly to give Gibraltar domestic powers to deal with its own affairs whilst diluting the Governor's powers.

Members
The head of the legislature was initially Governor as President and then replaced by the Speaker, a member of the legislative council.

Both roles were filled by British appointments who were not Gibraltarians.

Presidents

Speakers of the Legislative Council

Officers
Clerk of the Legislative Council
 E.H. Davis Esq. OBE 1950-1961
 J.L. Pitaluga Esq. MBE 1961-1969

Members
General members of the council were elected by  proportional representation.

 Luis Francis Bruzon

References

Legislative Council
Legislative Council
Legislatures of British Overseas Territories
1950 establishments in Gibraltar
1969 disestablishments in Gibraltar
Gibraltar
Historical legislatures